Tivadar Cohn Hermann Alconiere (1797–1865) was a 19th-century Austro-Hungarian painter. Cohn Hermann was his original family name.

He was born in Mattersburg and began studying art in Vienna in 1812. Born to Jewish parents, he converted to Catholicism in order to pursue a career in art, and adopted the surname Alconiere. He made a pilgrimage to Rome in the 1830s, where he spent 13 years pursuing art studies. He returned to Hungary in the 1840s and painted in the towns of Székesfehérvár, Pápa and Pest until the 1850s when he moved back to Vienna. He then dedicated his life entirely to the pursuit of his religion and died as a cleric in a monastery at Vienna.

Alconiere painted mainly portraits such as Count László Károlyi on horseback.

References 

Hungarian painters
19th-century Austrian painters
19th-century Austrian male artists
Austrian male painters
Jewish painters
Austrian Roman Catholics
Hungarian Roman Catholics
Hungarian expatriates in Austria
People from Mattersburg District
Converts to Roman Catholicism from Judaism
1797 births
1865 deaths
Oberlander Jews